Selçuk Şahin (born 31 January 1981) is a Turkish former professional footballer who played as a defensive midfielder.

Honours

Turkey
FIFA Confederations Cup third place: 2003

Fenerbahçe
Süper Lig: 2003–04, 2004–05, 2006–07, 2010–11, 2013–14
Turkish Cup: 2011–12, 2012–13
Turkish Super Cup: 2007, 2009, 2014

References

External links
Profile at TFF.org
 
 
Profile at fenerbahce.org

1981 births
Living people
People from Tunceli
Turkish footballers
Kurdish sportspeople
Turkey international footballers
Turkey B international footballers
Turkey under-21 international footballers
Turkey youth international footballers
2003 FIFA Confederations Cup players
Süper Lig players
TFF First League players
Hatayspor footballers
İstanbulspor footballers
Fenerbahçe S.K. footballers
FC Wil players
Gençlerbirliği S.K. footballers
Göztepe S.K. footballers
Bursaspor footballers
Association football midfielders
Fenerbahçe S.K. (football) non-playing staff